The Clark Brothers, consisting of Steve (1924 – February 2017) and James ("Jimmy") (23 July 1922 – 30 October 2009), were an American double act, who achieved success in Britain in the postwar period. They were thought to be the last of the "brothers" acts of tap-dancing's golden age. During their career, they appeared alongside Frank Sinatra and The Beatles, and opened The Sands in Las Vegas. The Clark Brothers also played at Madison Square Gardens and the Apollo Theatre in New York.

Early lives
Born to parents Cornelius and Octavia, the Clark Brothers grew up in poverty in Philadelphia with sisters Fredretha, Lorraine,l and Evelyn, and a brother, Cornelius. The brothers were cousins of Sammy Davis Jr. By the age of 12, Steve, the youngest, was a seasoned soloist, singing and dancing. The two brothers' first engagement was at the Cotton Club in Harlem, when they were 15 and 17. In 1948, Frank Sinatra suggested they go to Britain with a show, and the country became their permanent home.

Career

The Clark Brothers gave their first British performance for King George VI, and became favorites in working men's clubs. They wrote hits for Max Bygraves, and appeared at the London Palladium, in addition to opening a "University of Showbusiness" in London, where Cliff Richard and Bonnie Langford were among their pupils. The Brothers were a regular dance act on the QE2 cruise liner in the mid 1980's, and were always very approachable to crew & passengers whilst walking around the Ship.( ex crew member)

Personal lives and deaths
Jimmy died on 30 October 2009, at the age of 87. He and his brother Steve had lived together in Dunstable. Jimmy's funeral took place on 17 November at St Peter's Priory in Dunstable.

Steve latterly lived in Brinsworth House, the retirement home run by the Entertainment Artistes' Benevolent Fund. He died in February 2017 at the age of 93. At St Mary's Church in Twickenham, his funeral featured a performance by Miquel Brown, with tributes from Simon Callow and Roger de Courcey. Steve was buried next to Jimmy in Dunstable. The brothers were both members of the Grand Order of Water Rats until their deaths.

Film and television appearances
 Super Drumming (German TV series) (1989) 
 The Good Old Days (1983)
 Sez Les (1973)
 Saturday Variety (1972)
 Sunday Night at the London Palladium (1967)
 Blackpool Night Out (1965)
 The Ed Sullivan Show (1965)
 Club Night (1964)
 The Royal Variety Show (1963)
 The Colgate Comedy Hour (1952–1955)
 The George Jessel Show (1954)
 Killer Diller'' (1948)

See also
 Tap dance

References

External links
 The Clark Brothers at the Apollo Theatre (from YouTube)
 2008 interview with Steve Clark (from YouTube)

African-American dancers
American dance groups
American tap dancers
20th-century American dancers
People from Dunstable
20th-century African-American people
Burials in Bedfordshire